The Ambassador of Malaysia to the Argentine Republic is the head of Malaysia's diplomatic mission to Argentina. The position has the rank and status of an Ambassador Extraordinary and Plenipotentiary and is based in the Embassy of Malaysia, Buenos Aires.

List of heads of mission

Ambassadors to Argentina

See also
 Argentina–Malaysia relations

References 

 
Argentina
Malaysia